Worthy is a studio album from Bettye LaVette. Red Cherry Records released the album on January 27, 2015. She worked with Joe Henry, in the production of this album. The album was nominated for Best Blues Album at the 58th Annual Grammy Awards.

Critical reception

Awarding the album four stars at AllMusic, Mark Deming states, "Worthy is another impressive release from an outstanding singer, and if it follows the pattern of some of her recent albums, nothing here sounds rote; this is the sound of an artist doing what she does best, and she is far more than worthy of this great music." Colin McGuire, rating the album an eight out of ten for PopMatters, describes, "Which, at the end of the day, is ultimately why Worthy succeeds: Bettye LaVette knows her strengths. She knows what makes that voice of hers so timeless, and she knows how to make songs sound like they are her own, even if she had no part in writing them. If these 11 tracks were designed to remind the world of a criminally forgotten musical treasure, they succeeded and then some." Giving the album four stars from Blurt, Michael Toland writes, "This record isn’t just Worthy – it’s essential."

Track listing

Personnel
 Jay Bellerose - drums, percussion
 Doyle Bramhall II - bass, guitar
 Chris Bruce - bass, acoustic guitar
 Ben Chapoteau-Katz - baritone sax
 Levon Henry - horn arrangements, tenor sax
 Linton Smith - trumpet
 Patrick Warren - Chamberlin, Hammond organ, piano

Chart performance

References

2015 albums
Bettye LaVette albums